Dennis Richard Ryder is a South African politician. He has been serving as a parliamentarian since July 2017. Ryder is a member of the Democratic Alliance (DA).

Political career
He started his political career by being elected the mini mayor of Bedfordview in 1983. He joined the Democratic Alliance (DA) and was elected a councillor of the Midvaal Local Municipality in 2011. He won re-election to a second term in 2016.

Parliamentary career
Ryder became a Member of Parliament in July 2017, as he was sworn in as a Member of the National Assembly, the lower house of Parliament. Following the May 2019 general election, he was elected to the upper house, the National Council of Provinces, as one of six permanent delegates from Gauteng. On 24 June, he was given his committee assignments.

Committee assignments
Joint Standing Committee on Defence
Select Committee on Appropriations
Select Committee on Education and Technology, Sports, Arts and Culture
Select Committee on Finance
Select Committee on Health and Social Services

References

External links
Dennis Richard Ryder – People's Assembly

Living people
Year of birth missing (living people)
People from Gauteng
White South African people
Democratic Alliance (South Africa) politicians
Members of the National Assembly of South Africa
Members of the National Council of Provinces